President of Poland's Football Cup was an annual football competition, taking place in the Second Polish Republic in the years 1936–1939. It was sponsored by President Ignacy Mościcki, and unlike today's Polish Cup, it did not feature clubs. Instead, it was a competition of the local districts of the PZPN (for example the team of Kraków's district of the PZPN consisted of selected best players of such clubs, as Wisła Kraków, Cracovia, and Garbarnia Kraków).

First two editions of the Cup (1936–1937) did not feature top players of the Ekstraklasa (see: Polish Football League (1927–1939)). In the 1938 and 1939 games, all best footballers participated in the competition.

1936 games

First stage, May 24, 1936 
 Wilno, Wilno – The B Team of the Polish Football League 2–1 (att. 4000),
 Bydgoszcz, Pomerania – Upper Silesia 3–2,
 Stanisławów, Stanisławów – Lwów 2–1 (att. 3500),
 Lublin, Lublin – Kraków 4–4,
 Częstochowa, Kielce – Poznań 2–4,
 Białystok, Białystok – Łódź 0–2,
 Warsaw, Warsaw – Polesie 9–0,
 Łuck, Wołyń – The A Team of the Polish Football League 3–6 (att. 8000).

Quarterfinals, August 2, 1936 
 Kraków, Kraków – Warsaw 4–0,
 Poznań, Poznań – Wilno 6–1,
 Bydgoszcz, Pomerania – Łódź  4–3,
 Stanisławów, Stanisławów – The A Team of the Polish Football League 2-2. The game was repeated in Stanisławów on November 8, 1936. This time, the A Team of the League routed the home side 5–1. The winners featured such Poland National Team players, as Ernest Wilimowski, Gerard Wodarz, Jan Wasiewicz, Spirydion Albański, Hubert Gad, Edmund Giemsa, and Ewald Dytko.

Semifinals, November 15, 1936 
 Kraków, Kraków – The A Team of the Polish Football League 5-3 after extra time (att. 5000). The team of Kraków was based mostly on players of Cracovia (such as Józef Korbas, and Wilhelm Góra),
 Poznań, Poznań – Pomerania 5–0 (att. 1000).

Final, November 22, 1936 
 Poznań, Poznań – Kraków 0–2 (att. 1500).

1937 games

First stage, June 20, 1937 
 Lwów, Lwów – Stanisławów 1–2 (att. 3000)
 Białystok, Białystok – Warsaw 3–5 (att. 2500),
 Łódź, Łódź  – Pomerania 2–1 (att. 1500),
 Lutsk, Volhynia – Lublin 2–1,
 Brzesc nad Bugiem, Polesie – Wilno 3–5,
 Sosnowiec. Kielce – Upper Silesia 0–4 (att. 2000),

Quarterfinals, July 4, 1937 
 Katowice. Upper Silesia – Poznań 3–0 (att. 1500),
 Lutsk, Volhynia – Wilno 0–1 (att. 3000),
 Stanisławów, Stanisławów – Kraków 1–4 (att. 3000),
 Warsaw, Warsaw – Łódź  3–0.

Semifinals, September 12, 1937 and October 10, 1937 
 Wilno, Wilno – Kraków 1–2 (att. 2000),
 Warsaw, Warsaw – Upper Silesia 1–4,

Final, November 14, 1937 
 Warsaw, Upper Silesia – Kraków 5–1 (att. 1500).

1938 games

First stage, May 22, 1938 
 Białystok, Białystok – Wilno 0–1,
 Brzesc nad Bugiem, Polesie – Warsaw 1–7,
 Lutsk, Volhynia – Stanisławów 2–3,
 Sosnowiec, Zagłębie Dąbrowskie – Łódź  3–4,
 Bydgoszcz, Pomorze – Poznań 4–2,
 Lublin, Lublin – Lwów 3–4,

Quarterfinals, July 17, 1938 
 Wilno, Wilno – Warsaw 0–3. The home team was entirely made of players of Śmigły Wilno, while Warsaw featured such footballers as Henryk Martyna, Erwin Nyc, and Stanisław Baran,
 Lwów, Lwów – Upper Silesia 7–1. The home team was based on players of Pogoń Lwów. Upper Silesia fielded, among others, Ewald Cebula, Teodor Peterek, and Ryszard Piec (att. 4000),
 Łódź, Łódź  – Pomerania 2–1 (att. 2500),
 Stanisławów, Stanisławów – Kraków 0–2.

Semifinals 
 Łódź, Łódź  – Lwów 2–3,
 Kraków, Kraków – Warsaw 5–3,

Final, November 27, 1938 
 Lwów, Lwów – Kraków 5–1. Lwów fielded six players of Pogoń Lwów (i.e. Michał Matyas), while Kraków featured Edward Madejski, Wilhelm Góra, and Jan Kotlarczyk. One player Oleksandr Skotsen' represented Ukraina Lwów (Lwów Voivodeship Class A).

1939 games

First round, May 3, 1939 
 Łódź, Łódź  – Upper Silesia 2–4. The home team fielded Antoni Gałecki, and the Silesians brought a score of top-class players, such as Ernest Wilimowski, Ryszard Piec, Wilhelm Piec, Edmund Giemsa, Hubert Gad, Gerard Wodarz, and Ewald Cebula (att. 600),
 Brzesc nad Bugiem, Polesie – Wilno 1–5 (att. 3000),
 Toruń, Pomerania – Białystok 9–0 (att. 1000),
 Sosnowiec. Zagłębie Dąbrowskie – Poznań 3–4 (att. 4000),
 Lutsk. Volhynia – Warsaw 1–5 (att. 3000),
 Stanisławów. Stanisławów – Lublin 3–1 (att. 2000).

Quarterfinals, June 29, 1939 
 Stanisławów. Stanisławów – Lwów 5–2. The visitors fielded a selection of the best players of the city, including eight footballers of Pogoń Lwów, and Aleksandr Skocen of Ukraina Lwów (att. 3000),
 Warsaw. Warsaw – Wilno 1–2. Among home team players, there were Władysław Szczepaniak, and Henryk Jaźnicki (att. 1000),
 Bydgoszcz. Pomerania – Upper Silesia 3–4. The Silesians fielded eight starters of the Poland National Team,
 Poznań. Poznań – Kraków 3–0. Home team fielded Kazimierz Lis and Edmund Białas, the visitors brought Edward Jabłoński, Wilhelm Góra, and Paweł Cyganek.

Semifinals, August, 6 and 15, 1939 
 Wilno. Wilno – Stanisławów 0–1 (att. 1000),
 Katowice. Upper Silesia – Poznań 0–2 (att. 2000).

Final, November 5, 1939 
 Stanisławów – Poznań. The game did not take place due to the Nazi and Soviet attack on Poland, which marked the outbreak of World War II.

Sources

See also 
 Football in Poland
 Poland national football team
 Polish football in the interwar period
 Polish Football League (1927–1939)

Football cup competitions in Poland
Defunct football competitions in Poland
1936 in Polish football
1937 in Polish football
1938 in Polish football
1939 in Polish football
Polish football in the interwar period